
The Mhlathuze River is a river in South Africa. Located in KwaZulu-Natal, its catchment area has a surface area of 4,209 km2. It rises in the west in the Babanango hills at an altitude of 1,519 m and flows over 100 km eastwards to the sea forming an estuary. The deep-sea port of Richards Bay is situated at the mouth of the Mhlathuze River and all industrial development is focused within the Empangeni / Richards Bay complex.

Dams
Goedertrouw Dam

See also
 List of rivers of South Africa

References

External links
Microbiological evaluation of the Mhlathuze River in KwaZulu-Natal
Mhlathuze Weir

Rivers of KwaZulu-Natal